Maoricrater is a genus of true limpets, marine gastropod molluscs in the family Lepetidae, the true limpets. This genus is endemic to New Zealand. It can grow up to 4 mm in length.

Species
Species within the genus Maoricrater include:
 Maoricrater concentrica (von Middendorff, 1847 North Pacific)
 Maoricrater concentrica cryptobranchia (von Middendorff, 1851 America)
 Maoricrater explorata (Dell, 1953 New Zealand)
 Maoricrater lima (Dall, 1918 Indo-Pacific)

References

 Powell A. W. B., New Zealand Mollusca, William Collins Publishers Ltd, Auckland, New Zealand 1979 

Lepetidae
Gastropods of New Zealand
Taxa named by Harold John Finlay